Tik-Guba is the rural locality (a Posyolok) in Apatity municipality of Murmansk Oblast, Russia.  The village is located beyond the Arctic circle, on the Kola Peninsula. Located at a height of 121 m above sea level.

References

Rural localities in Murmansk Oblast